The Gramse, also known as The Nicholson, historic apartment building located at Indianapolis, Indiana.  It was built in 1915, and is a two-story, Bungalow / American Craftsman style, yellow brick and limestone building on a raised brick basement. It has a cross-hipped roof with dormers. It features stuccoed section and decorative half-timbering, three-sided bay windows, and corner porches.  The building has been converted to condominiums.

It was listed on the National Register of Historic Places in 2011.

References

Apartment buildings in Indiana
Residential buildings on the National Register of Historic Places in Indiana
Bungalow architecture in Indiana
Residential buildings completed in 1915
Residential buildings in Indianapolis
National Register of Historic Places in Indianapolis